This is a list of amphibians found in Panama. 205 amphibian species have been registered in Panama, which are grouped in 3 orders: Caecilians (Gymnophiona), Salamanders (Caudata) and Frogs and Toads (Anura). This list is derived from the database listing of AmphibiaWeb. 25 species are critically endangered(CR), 16 species are endangered (EN) and 6 species are vulnerable (VU). One species has recently (September 2016) gone extinct with the last individual in captivity dying, and with not a single specimen seen nor heard in the wild for over a decade. Several other species might also be extinct with no specimen found for decades.

The following tags are used to highlight specific species' conservation status as assessed by the IUCN:

Caecilians (Gymnophiona)

Caeciliidae 
Order: Gymnophiona. 
Family: Caeciliidae
Caecilia isthmica (DD)
Caecilia leucocephala (LC)
Caecilia nigricans (LC)
Caecilia tentaculata (LC)
Caecilia volcani (DD)
Oscaecilia elongata (DD)
Oscaecilia ochrocephala (LC)

Salamanders (Caudata)

Plethodontidae 
Order: Caudata. 
Family: Plethodontidae
Bolitoglossa anthracina (DD)
Bolitoglossa biseriata (LC)
Bolitoglossa bramei (DD)
Bolitoglossa colonnea (LC)
Bolitoglossa compacta (EN)
Bolitoglossa copia (DD)
Bolitoglossa cuna (DD)
Bolitoglossa gomezi (DD)
Bolitoglossa lignicolor (VU)
Bolitoglossa magnifica (EN)
Bolitoglossa marmorea (EN)
Bolitoglossa medemi (VU)
Bolitoglossa minutula (EN)
Bolitoglossa phalarosoma (DD)
Bolitoglossa pygmaea 
Bolitoglossa robinsoni 
Bolitoglossa robusta (LC)
Bolitoglossa schizodactyla (LC)
Bolitoglossa sombra (VU)
Bolitoglossa taylori (DD)
Oedipina alfaroi (VU)
Oedipina collaris (DD)
Oedipina complex (LC)
Oedipina cyclocauda (LC)
Oedipina fortunensis 
Oedipina grandis (EN)
Oedipina maritima (CR)
Oedipina parvipes (LC)

Toads and frogs (Anura)

Bufonidae 
Order: Anura. 
Family: Bufonidae
Atelopus certus (EN)
Atelopus chiriquiensis (CR)
Atelopus glyphus (CR)
Atelopus limosus (EN)
Atelopus varius (CR)
Atelopus zeteki (CR)
Incilius aucoinae (LC)
Incilius coniferus (LC)
Incilius epioticus (LC)
Incilius fastidiosus (CR)
Incilius karenlipsae 
Incilius melanochlorus (LC)
Incilius peripatetes (CR)
Incilius signifer (LC)
Rhaebo haematiticus (LC)
Rhinella acrolopha (DD)
Rhinella alata (DD)
Rhinella centralis
Rhinella marina (LC)

Centrolenidae 
Order: Anura. 
Family: Centrolenidae
Cochranella euknemos (LC)
Cochranella granulosa (LC)
Espadarana prosoblepon (LC)
Hyalinobatrachium aureoguttatum (NT)
Hyalinobatrachium chirripoi (LC)
Hyalinobatrachium colymbiphyllum (LC)
Hyalinobatrachium fleischmanni (LC)
Hyalinobatrachium valerioi (LC)
Hyalinobatrachium vireovittatum (DD)
Sachatamia albomaculata (LC)
Sachatamia ilex (LC)
Teratohyla pulverata (LC)
Teratohyla spinosa (LC)

Craugastoridae 
Order: Anura. 
Family: Craugastoridae
Craugastor andi (CR)
Craugastor azueroensis (EN)
Craugastor bransfordii (LC)
Craugastor catalinae (CR)
Craugastor crassidigitus (LC)
Craugastor emcelae (CR)
Craugastor evanesco 
Craugastor fitzingeri (LC)
Craugastor fleischmanni (CR)
Craugastor gollmeri (LC)
Craugastor gulosus (EN)
Craugastor jota (DD)
Craugastor longirostris (LC)
Craugastor megacephalus (LC)
Craugastor melanostictus (LC)
Craugastor monnichorum (DD)
Craugastor noblei (LC)
Craugastor obesus (EN)
Craugastor opimus (LC)
Craugastor podiciferus (NT)
Craugastor polyptychus (LC)
Craugastor punctariolus (EN)
Craugastor raniformis (LC)
Craugastor ranoides (CR)
Craugastor rhyacobatrachus (EN)
Craugastor rugosus (LC)
Craugastor stejnegerianus (LC)
Craugastor tabasarae (CR)
Craugastor talamancae (LC)
Craugastor taurus (CR)
Craugastor underwoodi (LC)

Dendrobatidae 
Order: Anura. 
Family: Dendrobatidae
Allobates talamancae (LC)
Ameerega maculata (DD)
Andinobates claudiae (DD)
Andinobates fulguritus (LC)
Andinobates minutus (LC)
Colostethus latinasus (DD)
Colostethus panamansis (LC)
Colostethus pratti (LC)
Dendrobates auratus (LC)
Oophaga arborea (EN)
Oophaga granulifera (VU)
Oophaga pumilio (LC)
Oophaga speciosa (EN)
Oophaga vicentei (DD)
Phyllobates lugubris (LC)
Silverstoneia flotator (LC)
Silverstoneia nubicola (NT)

Dermophiidae 
Order: Gymniophiona. 
Family: Dermophiidae
Dermophis glandulosus (DD)
Dermophis gracilior (DD)
Dermophis parviceps (LC)
Gymnopis multiplicata (LC)

Eleutherodactylidae 
Order: Anura. 
Family: Eleutherodactylidae
Diasporus diastema (LC)
Diasporus quidditus (LC)
Diasporus vocator (LC)
Eleutherodactylus antillensis (LC)
Eleutherodactylus johnstonei (LC)
Eleutherodactylus planirostris (LC)

Hemiphractidae 
Order: Anura. 
Family: Hemiphractidae
Gastrotheca cornuta (EN)
Gastrotheca nicefori (LC)
Hemiphractus fasciatus (NT)

Hylidae 
Order: Anura. 
Family: Hylidae
Agalychnis callidryas (LC)
Agalychnis lemur (CR)
Agalychnis spurrelli (LC)
Anotheca spinosa (LC)
Cruziohyla calcarifer (LC)
Dendropsophus ebraccatus (LC)
Dendropsophus microcephalus (LC)
Dendropsophus phlebodes (LC)
Dendropsophus subocularis (LC)
Duellmanohyla lythrodes (EN)
Duellmanohyla uranochroa (CR)
Ecnomiohyla fimbrimembra (EN)
Ecnomiohyla miliaria (VU)
Ecnomiohyla rabborum (EX)
Ecnomiohyla thysanota (DD)
Hyloscirtus colymba (CR)
Hyloscirtus palmeri (LC)
Hypsiboas boans (LC)
Hypsiboas crepitans (LC)
Hypsiboas pugnax (LC)
Hypsiboas rosenbergi (LC)
Hypsiboas rufitelus (LC)
Isthmohyla angustilineata (CR)
Isthmohyla calypsa (CR)
Isthmohyla debilis (CR)
Isthmohyla graceae (CR)
Isthmohyla infucata (DD)
Isthmohyla lancasteri (LC)
Isthmohyla picadoi (NT)
Isthmohyla pictipes (EN)
Isthmohyla pseudopuma (LC)
Isthmohyla rivularis (CR)
Isthmohyla tica (CR)
Isthmohyla zeteki (NT)
Phyllomedusa venusta (LC)
Ptychohyla legleri (EN)
Scinax boulengeri (LC)
Scinax elaeochroa (LC)
Scinax rostratus (LC)
Scinax ruber (LC)
Scinax staufferi (LC)
Smilisca phaeota (LC)
Smilisca sila (LC)
Smilisca sordida (LC)
Trachycephalus venulosus (LC)

Leptodactylidae 
Order: Anura. 
Family: Leptodactylidae
Engystomops pustulosus (LC)
Leptodactylus fragilis (LC)
Leptodactylus fuscus (LC)
Leptodactylus insularum 
Leptodactylus melanonotus (LC)
Leptodactylus poecilochilus (LC)
Leptodactylus savagei (LC)
Pleurodema brachyops (LC)

Microhylidae 
Order: Anura. 
Family: Microhylidae
Chiasmocleis panamensis (LC)
Elachistocleis ovalis (LC)
Nelsonophryne aterrima (LC)
Relictivomer pearsei (LC)

Pipidae 
Order: Anura. 
Family: Pipidae
Pipa myersi (EN)

Ranidae 
Order: Anura. 
Family: Ranidae
Rana vaillanti (LC)
Rana vibicaria (CR)
Rana warszewitschii (LC)

Strabomantidae 
Order: Anura. 
Family: Strabomantidae
Pristimantis achatinus (LC)
Pristimantis adnus 
Pristimantis altae (NT)
Pristimantis caryophyllaceus (NT)
Pristimantis cerasinus (LC)
Pristimantis cruentus (LC)
Pristimantis educatoris 
Pristimantis gaigei (LC)
Pristimantis moro (LC)
Pristimantis museosus (EN)
Pristimantis pardalis (NT)
Pristimantis pirrensis (DD)
Pristimantis ridens (LC)
Pristimantis taeniatus (LC)
Strabomantis bufoniformis (LC)
Strabomantis laticorpus (DD)

Notes

References 

 
Amphibians
Panama
Panama